"Shirayuki" is a song by South Korean idol group Myname. It was released on November 20, 2013, as its third Japanese single under YM3D. Written by INP, Lensei, and Zen Nishizawa, it is the quintet's first ballad released as a single in the country.

"Shirayuki" was released in three editions: Web Edition, and Limited Editions A and B. It peaked at number seven on Japan's weekly national Oricon Singles Chart, selling over 28,000 physical copies by the end of its chart run. The song was included in the group's second Japanese album Five Stars (2014).

Composition
"Shirayuki" was written by INP, Lensei, and Zen Nishizawa. A winter song, it is Myname's first sad piano ballad released as a single in Japan. "Sha La La" is a medium-tempo track which consists of a guitar riff. A "strong" and "catchy" dance song, "Baby I'm Sorry" compromises a piano and electronic music. "Miracle" is a dance song, while EDM is integrated into "Zoom Zoom".

Release and promotion
"Shirayuki" was first announced on September 21, 2013, with a scheduled release date of November 20. Leading up to its release, the short version of the music video for the song was uploaded on YouTube on October 18, with the full version being unveiled on November 5. The title track was made available on online music stores on November 13. It was used as the theme song for the group's first film Shinokubo Story (2013).

"Shirayuki" was released in three editions: Web Edition; Limited Edition A with bonus DVD content that includes the music video and making film of the title track; and Limited Edition B with bonus DVD content that includes the music video of "Sha La La". The title track was included in the group's second Japanese studio album Five Stars (2014).

Commercial performance
On the issue dated December 2, 2012, "Shirayuki" debuted at number seven on Japan's national Oricon Singles Chart, selling 25,263 copies in its first week of release. According to Oricon, the single charted for three weeks and sold 28,200 copies in the country by the end of its run. The song also ranked at number 98 on the Billboard Japan Hot 100 chart.

Track listing

Charts

References

External links
 

2010s ballads
2013 singles
2013 songs
Japanese-language songs
Myname songs